CoreMedia is a global provider of digital experience solutions with corporate headquarters in Hamburg, Germany, and U.S. headquarters in Arlington, Virginia. The company was founded in 1996 and has additional offices in Washington DC, Singapore and London.

Its flagship product, LiveContext 3, is a Content Management System built for eCommerce Scenarios.

Company Overview
The company was founded in 1996 by Prof. Joachim W. Schmidt, Prof. Florian Matthes, Andreas Gawecki, and Sören Stamer as a spin-off from Hamburg University of Science and Technology.  Its first two customers were Deutsche Presse Agentur and Axel Springer Verlag.  In 2000, the company was renamed as CoreMedia AG and the following year Deutsche Telekom launched its T-Online portal on CoreMedia software.  The company opened its first North American offices in 2005. 

In 2012, CoreMedia introduced Elastic Social, an enhanced version of its social toolset with new social interaction capabilities, content moderation tools, user management, and a scalable NoSQL datastore. Two years later, CoreMedia LiveContext for IBM WebSphere Commerce was launched. 

CoreMedia delivered the current version of CoreMedia 9, in January 2017.

Customers

CoreMedia's clients include the Association of American Medical Colleges (AAMC), Australian Broadcasting Corporation (ABC), Bertelsmann, BILD, Claas, Continental AG, Epcos, Deutsche Telekom, Henkel, Internet Broadcasting Systems, Office Depot, JD Group, Tchibo, Telefónica Germany and ZDF.

The CoreMedia platform has been the original technology that powered the German Government Site Builder. The Government Site Builder (GSB) provides all federal authorities of the German government with a uniform content management system (CMS). CoreMedia partner, Materna, developed the solution on behalf of the German Federal Office of Administration and customized it to meet the requirements of the federal authorities.  Later versions of the Government Site Builder have been migrated away from CoreMedia and rely on open-source software.

Competitors

CoreMedia competes with Adobe AEM, Crafter CMS, Acquia, Amplience, Bloomreach, Sitecore, SDL Tridion, e-Spirit FirstSpirit, and other enterprise content management systems.

See also
 Web Content Management System
 Customer Experience
 Enterprise Content Management
 Government Site Builder(German)

References

Content management systems
Companies based in Hamburg